WST may refer to:

 Web Science Trust, a UK Charitable Trust
Western Standard Time, a proper name for one of Australia's time zones observed in Western Australia (UTC +8)
 West Samoa Time, the standard West Samoa Time Zone 
 Samoan tala, the ISO 4217 code for the currency of Samoa
 Water Soluble Tetrazolium, in relation to Tetrazolium salts
 World System Teletext
 Weapons System Trainer, US military term for a flight simulator optimised for weapons training
 Wholesale sales tax, a form of sales tax
 Willamette Shore Trolley, a heritage streetcar service in Oregon, United States
 Water Science and Technology, a scientific journal on the management of water quality.
 Westerly State Airport IATA code 
 Wood Street railway station, London, National Rail station code
 World Snooker Tour, the main professional snooker tournament arrangement